Not be confused with Aussie.
Aussee may refer to:

Bad Aussee, Austria
Aussee, German exonym for Úsov